The following lists events that happened during 1793 in Australia.

Leaders
Monarch - George III
Acting Governor of New South Wales – Lieutenant-Governor Francis Grose
Lieutenant-Governor of Norfolk Island – Philip Gidley King
Commanding officer of the New South Wales Corps – Francis Grose

Events
 16 January – Bellona arrives with Australia's first free settlers.
 22 January – The French d'Entrecasteaux expedition returns to Recherche Bay, Tasmania, to rewater and rest.
 12 February – John Macarthur is granted  of land at Parramatta.
 16 February – John Macarthur is appointed by Grose as inspector of public works.
 18 February – A school opens in an unfinished church building in Sydney; Isabella Rosson is the first teacher (the first school had been established in 1789).
 28 February – d'Entrecasteaux expedition leaves Tasmania towards the Friendly Islands, continuing search for La Pérouse.
 2 May – Mary Bryant is pardoned in England.
 May – Bennelong and Yemmerrawanne become the first Aboriginal Australians to visit Britain when they land at Falmouth, Cornwall, with Arthur Phillip.
 15 September – Captain William Paterson leads a party of Scotsmen in the first attempt to cross the Blue Mountains. He is unsuccessful.
 25 September – Sydney's first church opens.
 Macquarie Lighthouse, the first in Australia, is erected in Sydney.

Births
8 March – David Jones
1 June – Augustus Earle

References

 
Australia
Years of the 18th century in Australia